Lin Fa Shan (Chinese: 蓮花山) is the seventh highest mountain in Hong Kong. With a height of 766 m on Lantau Island, it is situated between Mui Wo and Sunset Peak.

Name 
The Cantonese name Lin Fa Shan (Chinese: 蓮花山; Jyutping: Lin4 Faa1 Saan1) literally means "Lotus Flower Mountain".

Subpeaks
There are a few subpeaks that are given names in the Lin Fa Shan area, including:

 Sam Shan Toi
 Ap Kuk Lek

See also

 List of mountains, peaks and hills in Hong Kong

References 

Mountains, peaks and hills of Hong Kong
Lantau Island